Edward DeKalb Acuff (June 3, 1903 – December 17, 1956) was an American stage and film actor. He frequently was cast as a droll comic relief, in the support of the star. His best-known recurring role is that of Mr. Beasley, the postman, in the Blondie movie series that starred Penny Singleton and Arthur Lake.

Early years
Acuff was born in Caruthersville, Missouri. He was the son of DeKalb Acuff (1880-1916) and his wife Grace (later known as Mrs. H. N. Arnold),.

Career 
Before beginning his Hollywood film career in 1934, Acuff performed in Broadway theatre in the early-1930s. His Broadway credits include Jayhawker (1934), Yellow Jack (1934), John Brown (1934), Growing Pains (1933), Heat Lightning (1933), and The Dark Hours (1932).

In 1935, Warner Bros. signed Acuff to a long-term contract and scheduled him to debut on film in Anchors Aweigh. He had a recurring role as the postman in the Blondie film series. Acuff was seen in three film serials — as Curly in Jungle Girl, as Red Kelly in Daredevils of the West, and as Spud Warner in Chick Carter Detective.

Death 
On December 17, 1956, Acuff died of a heart attack in Hollywood, California. He is buried in Valhalla Memorial Park Cemetery.

Filmography

Film

Television

References

External links

http://www.acuff.org/

1903 births
1956 deaths
American male film actors
American male stage actors
Male actors from Missouri
20th-century American male actors
Burials at Valhalla Memorial Park Cemetery
People from Caruthersville, Missouri